Gene Long (born 1957) is a former politician in Newfoundland and Labrador, Canada.

He was elected in 1986 as the New Democratic Party member of the House of Assembly for the riding of St. John's East.  Long ran for the party leadership in March 1989 but was defeated by Cle Newhook by a margin of 21 votes. Long lost his seat in the provincial election a month later.

In the 1990s, he moved to Toronto. He was a senior policy advisor in the Government of Ontario and later the communications manager at the Ontario Ombudsman's office. He worked as the communications manager at the public health department of the City of Toronto, and then as senior policy advisor at Toronto Public Health.

He is also the published author of a political history of Newfoundland. He has a Master of Arts degree from Memorial University of Newfoundland.

Publications
 Long, Gene. Suspended state : Newfoundland before Canada / Gene Long. St. John's, Nfld. : Breakwater Books, 1999. 218 p. ; 21 cm. 
 Long, Gene. William Coaker and the loss of faith: toward and beyond consensus in the suspension of Newfoundland's self-government, 1925-1933 Thesis (M.A.)--Memorial University of Newfoundland, 1992. University Microfilms order no. UMI00427744.

References

1957 births
20th-century Canadian historians
Canadian male non-fiction writers
Living people
Newfoundland and Labrador New Democratic Party MHAs